= Paulssen =

Paulssen is a surname. Notable people with the surname include:

- Arnold Paulssen (1864–1942), German lawyer, politician and statesman
- Bertha Paulssen (1891–1973), German-American social worker and professor
- Christoph Paulssen (born 1963), German bass player, composer and producer
- Hans Constantin Paulssen (1892–1984), German industrialist and President of the Confederation of German Employers' Associations
